In Greek mythology, Diorês (Ancient Greek: Διώρης) referred to four different people.

Diorês, father of Automedon who was the charioteer of Achilles during the Trojan War.
Diorês, leader of the Elis contingent during the Trojan War. He was the son of Amarynceus (Diorês Amaryngkëidês). Diores was killed by Peiros.
Diorês, a Trojan prince who participated in the games held by the exiled Aeneas in Sicily. He was killed by Turnus, the man who opposed Aeneas in Italy.
Diorês, son of Aeolus, who married his sister Polymela. With his father's approval, he married his sister Polymele who was otherwise about to be put to death because of her secret love affair with Odysseus.

Notes

References 

 Aken, Dr. A.R.A. van. (1961). Elseviers Mythologische Encyclopedie. Amsterdam: Elsevier.
 Bartelink, Dr. G.J.M. (1988). Prisma van de mythologie. Utrecht: Het Spectrum.
 Gaius Julius Hyginus, Fabulae from The Myths of Hyginus translated and edited by Mary Grant. University of Kansas Publications in Humanistic Studies. Online version at the Topos Text Project.
Homer, The Iliad with an English Translation by A.T. Murray, Ph.D. in two volumes. Cambridge, MA., Harvard University Press; London, William Heinemann, Ltd. 1924. . Online version at the Perseus Digital Library.
 Homer, Homeri Opera in five volumes. Oxford, Oxford University Press. 1920. . Greek text available at the Perseus Digital Library.
 Homer, The Odyssey with an English Translation by A.T. Murray, PH.D. in two volumes. Cambridge, MA., Harvard University Press; London, William Heinemann, Ltd. 1919. . Online version at the Perseus Digital Library. Greek text available from the same website.
 Publius Vergilius Maro, Aeneid. Theodore C. Williams. trans. Boston. Houghton Mifflin Co. 1910. Online version at the Perseus Digital Library.
 Publius Vergilius Maro, Bucolics, Aeneid, and Georgics. J. B. Greenough. Boston. Ginn & Co. 1900. Latin text available at the Perseus Digital Library.
 Vollmer, Wilhelm. (1874). Wörterbuch der Mythologie. Stuttgart, p. 85.

Achaean Leaders
Characters in Greek mythology